Filip Kljajić may refer to:

Filip Kljajić (Yugoslav Partisan), a Yugoslav Partisan fighter during World War II and political commissar of the 1st Proletarian Brigade
Filip Kljajić (footballer), Serbian association football goalkeeper who plays for FK Partizan